Oneonta Municipal Airport  is a public use airport located three nautical miles (6 km) north of the central business district of Oneonta, a city in Otsego County, New York, United States. The airport is owned by the City of Oneonta. It once had scheduled air service on Mohawk Airlines, formerly known as Catskill Airways.

Facilities and aircraft 
It has one runway designated 6/24 with an asphalt surface measuring 4,200 by 75 feet (1,280 x 23 m).

For the 12-month period ending February 21, 2008, the airport had 21,600 aircraft operations, an average of 59 per day: 86% general aviation, 14% air taxi, and <1% military. At that time there were 9 aircraft based at this airport: 67% single-engine, 22% multi-engine and 11% helicopter.

References

External links 
  page from New York State DOT Airport Directory
 Aerial photo as of 5 May 1997 from USGS The National Map
 
 

Airports in New York (state)
Buildings and structures in Otsego County, New York
Transportation in Otsego County, New York